The Global Forum on Migration and Development (GFMD) is a state-led, informal and non-binding process, which helps shape the global debate on migration and development. It provides a flexible, multi-stakeholder space where governments can discuss the multi-dimensional aspects, opportunities and challenges related to migration, development, and the link between these two areas. The GFMD process allows governments - in partnership with civil society, the private sector, the UN system, and other relevant stakeholders – to analyze and discuss sensitive issues, create consensus, pose innovative solutions, and share policy and practices.

Background

The idea of creating a global consultative forum on Migration and Development was proposed by Mr. Kofi Annan, former Secretary-General of the United Nations (UN), at the first High-Level Dialogue on International Migration and Development (HLD) held on 14–15 September 2006 during the UN General Assembly. During the HLD, over 140 Member States discussed the interaction between migration and development, a complex relationship of growing importance in view of the increasing migration flows. Yet there was still a crippling lack of information and data and appropriate institutional structures and resources in many countries to achieve these; and importantly, there was no single, all-encompassing global forum to bring together policy makers on the two critical issues of migration and development. Some good practices were tried in a piecemeal way by governments and international agencies around the world, but these needed to be more widely understood and adapted, and more cooperative frameworks needed to be explored.

Reflecting the progressive acknowledgement of the limits of a strictly national approach to migration questions at a global level, there was widespread recognition and support in the UN at the HLD 2006 for an open and transparent dialogue on migration and development, in an informal, non-binding and state-led framework that would promote practical, evidence-based outcomes and cooperation between governments as well as non-government stakeholders.

From this idea, the GFMD was born, hosting its first Summit meeting in 2007 under the direction of the first GFMD Chair, Belgium. The GFMD has since remained as the largest informal, non-binding, voluntary and government-led process, bringing together expertise from all regions and countries at all stages of economic, social and political development. Since its inception, the GFMD has operated on the basis of a unique participative working method, involving governments and policy makers from a varied background. Policy-makers from a wide range of government agencies participate, including from Ministries and Departments of Immigration, Development, Labor, Foreign Affairs, Gender Equality, Home Affairs, Justice, Interior, Integration and Nationals Abroad.

Consistent with its state-led but not state only nature, the GFMD has also established formal links with other processes such as the GFMD Civil Society, the GFMD Business Mechanism and the Mayors Mechanism. These institutional links have allowed the inclusion of the voices and expertise of diverse stakeholders, including academia, NGOs, trade unions, the private sector, migrants and diaspora representatives as well as local authorities, in GFMD discussions.

Objectives

The objectives of the GFMD are:

 To provide a venue for policy-makers and high-level policy practitioners to informally discuss relevant policies and practical challenges and opportunities of the migration-development nexus, and engage with other stakeholders, including non-governmental organizations, experts and migrant organizations to foster practical and action-oriented outcomes at national, bilateral and international level;
 To exchange good practices and experiences, which can be duplicated or adapted in other circumstances, in order to maximize the development benefits of migration and migration flows;
 To identify information, policy and institutional gaps necessary to foster synergies and greater policy coherence at national, regional and international levels between the migration and development policy areas;
 To establish partnerships and cooperation between countries, and between countries and other stakeholders, such as international organizations, diaspora, migrants, academia etc., on migration and development;
 To structure the international priorities and agenda on migration and development.

Structure

Under the Operating Modalities of the GFMD adopted in 2007, the Forum meets every year for an inter-active and practice-oriented dialogue. It is attended by high-level and senior government policy-makers, and its deliberations are held under Chatham House Rules. A Report of Proceedings is prepared at the end of each Forum.

The supporting framework of the GFMD includes the following:

 The Chair-in-Office: The host government assumes responsibility for the preparatory process and the implementation of each Forum. The Chair also supervises the GFMD Support Unit. The current GFMD Chair is the Government of Ecuador.
 The Troika: composed of the outgoing chair, the current chair, and the forthcoming chair.
 The Steering Group: composed of a smaller number of governments that are firmly committed to offer sustained political and conceptual support to the Forum process and to the Chair-in-Office, and to ensure continuity of the process. The Steering Group meets at regular intervals in Geneva to consider and advise on all relevant policy issues pertaining to the smooth running of the Forum process. It may also create thematic follow-up working groups.
Steering Group Members:

 The Friends of the Forum: open to all UN Member States and Observers. It acts as a sounding board by ensuring that all Members States and Observers of the UN are kept abreast of Forum-related developments; and advises on the agenda, structure and format of the GFMD meeting. Friends of the Forum Meetings are held, in principle, at least twice in between each Forum meeting at a venue to be determined by the Chair-in-Office.
GFMD Governments:

GFMD Observers:

 The Chair's Taskforce:  gives political, conceptual and operational advice to the chair, composed of: national government staff from different ministries and departments and a limited number of international advisers sponsored by other governments or international organizations.
 The GFMD Support Unit: created in 2008 to perform administrative, financial and logistical functions; manage GFMD-related data and information; manage internationally contributed funds; and operate the GFMD website and the GFMD Platform for Partnerships (the latter since 2010).
 The Global Network of GFMD Focal Points: created in 2007 to facilitate further dialogue at the national level, as well as networking at the global level between GFMD governments.
 The GFMD government-led Working Groups, established by the Steering Group, which prioritize and follow up on outcomes of previous GFMD meetings and link these to current and future thematic priorities.
 The UN Migration Network, brings together 38 UN entities (as of December 2018) to ensure effective, timely and coordinated system-wide support to Member States. Building on GFMD's close working relationship with UN entities dealing with migration and development, particularly IOM, the GFMD is poised to coordinate closely with the UN Network on Migration (and its member UN entities) to promote thematic synergy and coherent work planning.   While in the past, the primary connection between the GFMD and the UN was through the UN Secretary General's Special Representative for International Migration (SRSG), it will now be through the UN Network.

Past GFMD Chairs in Office

The host country (Chair-in-Office) assumes responsibility for the preparatory process and the implementation of each Forum. The host government chairs all sessions related to Forum preparations and chairs the Forum. The Chair-in-Office is assisted by the country that organized the previous Forum and the country that will host the following meeting of the Forum.

 Belgium 2007 : Régine de Clercq, former Ambassador for Migration and Asylum Policy of Belgium, who also acted as the Belgian Executive Director of the Global Forum on Migration and Development. 
 Philippines 2008: Esteban B. Conejos Jr., Undersecretary for Migrant Workers' Affairs of the Philippine Department of Foreign Affairs. He was the Philippine GFMD focal point and Secretary General of the GFMD National Organizing Committee. 
 Greece 2009: Mrs. Theodora Tzakri, Deputy Minister of Interior, Decentralization and E-Governance, chaired the Athens GFMD meeting.  
 Mexico 2010: Ambassador Juan Manuel Gómez Robledo, Undersecretary for Multilateral Affairs and Human Rights of the Mexican Ministry of Foreign Affairs initially acted as chair. Mrs. Cecilia Romero Castillo, then Commissioner of INM, acted as executive director. On 7 October, she was succeeded by Mr. Salvador Beltrán del Rio Madrid. In late October 2010, Amb Julián Ventura Valero, Undersecretary for North America at the SRE, took over the role of the GFMD Chair after Amb Gómez Robledo. 
 Switzerland 2011: Ambassador Eduard Gnesa, Swiss Special Ambassador for International Cooperation in Migration.
 Mauritius 2012: Mr. Ali Mansoor, Financial Secretary of the Ministry of Finance and Economic Development (MOFED) of the Republic of Mauritius. 
 Sweden 2013-2014: Mrs. Eva Åkerman Börje, Ambassador, Government Offices of Sweden.
 Turkey 2014-2015: H.E. Feridun Hadi Sinirlioğlu, Minister of Foreign Affairs of Turkey. The preparatory meetings were chaired alternately by Mr. Mehmet Samsar, Director General for Consular Affairs of the Turkish Ministry of Foreign Affairs and Ms. Esen Altug, Deputy Director General for Migration, Asylum and Visa of the Turkish Ministry of Foreign Affairs.
 Bangladesh 2016: H.E. Amb. Md. Shahidul Haque, Foreign Secretary of Bangladesh
 Germany-Morocco 2017-2018: Co-Chaired by Mr. Götz Schmidt-Bremme, Ambassador for the 2017-2018 GFMD at the German Federal Foreign Office and Mr. El Habib Nadir, Secretary General at the Ministry in charge of Moroccans living abroad and migration affairs.
 Ecuador 2019: Mr. Santiago Javier Chavez Pareja, Vice Minister for Human Mobility of Ecuador

Other GFMD Mechanisms

 GFMD Civil Society
 GFMD Business Mechanism
 GFMD Mayors Mechanism

The Platform for Partnerships (PfP)

Since the creation of the GFMD in 2007, there have been continued calls during the annual GFMD meetings for online sharing of good practices using the GFMD website. At the initiative of the Mexican Chair and with the support of the current Swiss Chair the PfP has been created towards the end of 2010 to address this need and to foster new partnerships.

The GFMD Platform for Partnerships (PfP - www.gfmd.org/pfp) is a tool to facilitate exchange and showcase projects, programs and policies that are undertaken by governments in the field of Migration and Development (M&D), and which are related to GFMD themes, debates and outcomes. The PfP is a four-pronged tool:

for showcasing existing (or past) practices (M&D Policy and Practice Database)
for fostering new projects and partnerships (M&D Calls for Action)
for facilitating communication and exchange (M&D Networking)
for showcasing products and policy tools (M&D Policy Tools)

See also
 GFMD Civil Society Process
 Global Migration Group
 KNOMAD

External links
 Official Website
 Website of ICMC, Coordinating Office for Civil Society
Website of IOE, Coordinating Office of the GFMD Business Mechanism

References and notes 

Human migration
International development organizations
United Nations organizations based in Geneva